Gilbert Mushangazhike (born 11 August 1975 in Harare) is a Zimbabwean footballer. The association football striker recently played in Swaziland by Manzini Sundowns, in China by Jiangsu Sainty, for Germany-based Kickers Emden and in South Africa for Manning Rangers F.C., Orlando Pirates and Mpumalanga Black Aces.

International career
He was a member of the Zimbabwean 2006 African Nations Cup team, who finished bottom of their group in the first round of competition, thus failing to secure qualification for the quarter-

International goals

Zimbabwe

Teams managed

In 2019, he was appointed as coach of Golden Eagles FC, a third tier team in Zimbabwe.

References

1975 births
Living people
Sportspeople from Harare
Zimbabwean footballers
Zimbabwe international footballers
2006 Africa Cup of Nations players
Association football forwards
Orlando Pirates F.C. players
Zimbabwean expatriates in Germany
Zimbabwean expatriates in South Africa
Zimbabwean expatriates in Eswatini
Zimbabwean expatriates in China
Expatriate footballers in Germany
Jiangsu F.C. players
China League One players
Expatriate footballers in China
Expatriate soccer players in South Africa
Expatriate footballers in Eswatini
Kickers Emden players
Manning Rangers F.C. players